Wu Qianlong (born 30 January 1990) is a male Chinese racewalker from Inner Mongolia. He competed in the 50 kilometres walk event at the 2015 World Championships in Athletics in Beijing, China, finishing the 14th.

See also
 China at the 2015 World Championships in Athletics

References

Chinese male racewalkers
Living people
Place of birth missing (living people)
1990 births
World Athletics Championships athletes for China
Sportspeople from Inner Mongolia